Les Impures , is a French drama film from 1954, directed by Pierre Chevalier, written by Juliette Saint-Giniez, starring Micheline Presle and Louis de Funès. The film is known under the titles "Human Cargo" (USA), "The Impure Ones" (international English title).

Cast 
 Micheline Presle: Michèle, nightclub singer
 Louis de Funès: the conductor
 Raymond Pellegrin: Jean-Marie Leclerc aka Mario, "the man coming out of prison"
 William Marshall: Charlie, the procurer
 Dora Doll: Lili, 
 Guy Mairesse: Mario's friend Bob
 Jacques Duby: pianist Fernand
 Colette Castel: Michèle's sister Danièle
 Daniel Cauchy: barkeeper Dédé
 René Sarvil: Mr Dominique, the pimp from Marseille
 Jacqueline Noëlle: a friend of Alger
 Lila Kedrova: the building's concierge
 Laurence Badie : a housewife

References

External links 
 
 Les Impures (1954) at the Films de France

1954 films
French drama films
1950s French-language films
French black-and-white films
Films directed by Pierre Chevalier
1954 drama films
1950s French films